Gavin Lindberg Brown (born 4 June 1975) is a Scottish Conservative Party politician. He was a Member of the Scottish Parliament (MSP) for the Lothians region from 2007 to 2011, and then for the Lothian region from 2011 to 2016.

He contested Edinburgh South at the 2005 UK general election, where he came third. He contested the same seat at the 2007 Scottish Parliament election finishing fourth, but was elected to Holyrood as a list member for the Lothians region.

He was the party's Tourism and Enterprise Spokesman and sat on the Economy, Energy and Tourism Committee at Holyrood. He announced in 2015 that he would not be standing for re-election as an MSP in 2016.

Brown worked as a solicitor at McGrigors before his election to Holyrood. He is also a black belt in Tae Kwon Do and in 2008 ran the Edinburgh Marathon. He lives in the Fairmilehead area of Edinburgh and is married with one daughter.

References

External links 
 
Scottish Conservative Party Biography
Gavin Brown for Edinburgh South

1975 births
Living people
Scottish solicitors
People from Musselburgh
Conservative MSPs
Members of the Scottish Parliament 2007–2011
Members of the Scottish Parliament 2011–2016